Tepuihyla luteolabris is a species of frog in the family Hylidae endemic to Venezuela where it can be found on a number of tepui. Its natural habitat is high montane tepui vegetation. Reproduction takes place in rivers.

Tepuihyla celsae, assessed as "data deficient" by the International Union for Conservation of Nature, is now considered a junior synonym of Tepuihyla luteolabris.

References

Tepuihyla
Amphibians of Venezuela
Endemic fauna of Venezuela
Amphibians described in 1993
Taxa named by José Ayarzagüena
Taxa named by Stefan Jan Filip Gorzula
Taxa named by Josefa Celsa Señaris
Taxonomy articles created by Polbot
Amphibians of the Tepuis